Ivan Valchanov (Bulgarian: Иван Вълчанов; born 28 September 1991) is a Bulgarian footballer who plays as a midfielder for Rilski Sportist.

Career
On 28 August 2012, Italian side Novara signed Valchanov on a season-long loan deal, with an option of making the move permanent.

On 28 January 2016, Valchanov signed with Cherno More.

Septemvri Sofia
On 17 June 2017 Valchanov signed with the newly returned to First League team of Septemvri Sofia. He made his debut for the team on 17 July 2017 in match against Dunav Ruse. On 7 August 2017, his contract was terminated by mutual consent.

Etar
On 8 August 2017, Valchanov signed with Etar Veliko Tarnovo.

Career statistics
As of 25 September 2020

References

External links

1991 births
Living people
People from Sandanski
Bulgarian footballers
Bulgaria under-21 international footballers
First Professional Football League (Bulgaria) players
Second Professional Football League (Bulgaria) players
FC Chavdar Etropole players
FC Montana players
Serie B players
Novara F.C. players
FC Lyubimets players
PFC Slavia Sofia players
PFC Cherno More Varna players
Neftochimic Burgas players
FC Septemvri Sofia players
SFC Etar Veliko Tarnovo players
FC Vitosha Bistritsa players
OFC Pirin Blagoevgrad players
FC Lokomotiv Gorna Oryahovitsa players
PFC Minyor Pernik players
Bulgarian expatriate footballers
Bulgarian expatriate sportspeople in Italy
Expatriate footballers in Italy
Association football midfielders
Sportspeople from Blagoevgrad Province